Bellorchestia quoyana (formerly Talorchestia quoyana) is the largest and most common species of sandhopper, endemic to New Zealand. They help to keep the beaches clean by breaking down any organic material, which is vital for plant succession. They are nocturnal and bury themselves up to  during the day (the drier the sand, the deeper they go).

Description 
Bellorchestia quoyana reaches lengths of 29 millimetres, with males being slightly larger than females. The body is typically light-yellowish brown with  marbled markings of a darker brown generally assimilating the appearance sand. It has a single pair of black eyes and two distinct pairs of antennae. The first pair of antennae are short and extend a little beyond the first joint of antennae 2. The second pair are more robust and extent beyond the head and first three body segments in females and over half the body length in males. The second section of antennae 2 is twice the length of the first.

Jumping action achieved by balancing on third to last pair of legs while turning the abdomen under the body so the end of the uropods and telson press on to the ground.  The last two pairs of legs are held parallel to but not touching the ground. When the abdomen is suddenly straightened out the animal is propelled into the air. On landing the abdominal limbs and last two pairs of legs are used as shock absorbers to cushion the impact.

Distribution 
Bellorchestia quoyana is found on sandy beaches all around the coasts of New Zealand.

References

External links

Gammaridea
Marine crustaceans of New Zealand
Crustaceans described in 1840
Taxa named by Henri Milne-Edwards